Lucky 7 is the seventh studio album by the Reverend Horton Heat. It was released by Artemis Records in February 2002.

The song "Like a Rocket" (with altered lyrics) was chosen as the official Daytona 500 theme song for 2002.

Track listing
All songs written by Jim Heath.
 "Loco Gringos Like a Party" – 4:48
 "Like a Rocket" – 2:43
 "Reverend Horton Heat's Big Blue Car" – 3:36
 "Galaxy 500" – 3:16
 "What's Reminding Me of You" – 2:56
 "The Tiny Voice of Reason" – 3:31
 "Duel at the Two O'Clock Bell" – 5:52
 "Go With Your Friends" – 3:30
 "Ain't Gonna Happen" – 3:51
 "Suicide Doors" – 2:56
 "Remember Me" – 2:44
 "Show Pony" – 1:44
 "Sermon on the Jimbo" – 2:41
 "You've Got a Friend in Jimbo" – 5:35

Personnel
Jim "Reverend Horton" Heath - vocals, guitar
Jimbo Wallace - upright bass
Scott Churilla - drums
Ed Stasium - producer, recorder, mixer
Jun - assistant engineer
Hatch - assistant engineer
Gene Grimaldi - mastering
Kaylynn Campbell - CD package design and illustrations
Johnny Ace - CD package design and illustrations
Jeff Wood - CD package design and illustrations

Charts

References

2002 albums
The Reverend Horton Heat albums
Albums produced by Ed Stasium
Artemis Records albums